Chana Porpaoin (born 1966-03-25 in Lom Sak District, Phetchabun Province, Thailand) is a Thai boxer. Chana and his younger brother, Songkram Porpaoin, became only the second set of twins to both capture world titles (the Galaxy twins were the first).

Biography & professional career 
Chana has a real name Koon Motma (คูณ หมดมา; nicknamed: Thid; ถิด). He started boxing from Muay Thai in the name "Lomnua Sakchainarong" (ลมเหนือ ศักดิ์ชัยณรงค์) by fighting regularly at Rajadamnern Stadium and also won mini flyweight champion in 1988.

He turned professional in May 1988 under Niwat "Chae-mae" Laosuwanwat of Galaxy Boxing Promotion and captured the World Boxing Association (WBA) minimumweight title with a majority decision win over Hideyuki Ohashi in early 1993 at Tokyo Metropolitan Gymnasium, Tokyo, Japan. He defended the title against 7 fighters before losing it to Rosendo Álvarez in the late 1995 by split decision at Sa Kaeo Province, Thailand. He recaptured the belt in 2001 with a win over Keitaro Hoshino, but lost the belt in his first defense to Yutaka Niida.

In 2004, he challenged for the WBA interim minimumweight title twice again with Juan Jose Landaeta, but was not successful (including one draw).

He retired along with his brother Songkram. After retirement he opened a rice shop in Bang Yai District, Nonthaburi Province.

See also 
List of Mini-flyweight boxing champions

References

External links 
 

1966 births
Living people
Mini-flyweight boxers
World mini-flyweight boxing champions
World Boxing Association champions
Chana Porpaoin
Chana Porpaoin
Chana Porpaoin
Chana Porpaoin